Mörlin is a surname of:

 Joachim Mörlin (1514-1571),  German Lutheran theologian and Reformer
 Jodok Mörlin (1490-1550), German Lutheran theologian
 Maximilian Mörlin (1516-1584), German Lutherantheologian, court preacher, Superintendent in Coburg, and Reformer

See also
Morling (surname)